Kotchawan Chomchuen (born 4 September 2000) is a Thai taekwondo practitioner. She represented Thailand at the 2018 Asian Games and clinched gold medal in the women's team poomsae event along with fellow taekwondo practitioners Phenkanya Phaisankiattikun and Ornawee Srisahakit defeating favourites South Korea in the final.

In 2016, she jointly with Phenkanya Phaisankiattikun and Ornawee Srisahakit claimed the Poomsae World Championship title in the women's team category for Thailand, which also historically became the first ever Poomsae World Championship title victory for Thailand.

References 

2000 births
Living people
Kotchawan Chomchuen
Taekwondo practitioners at the 2018 Asian Games
Medalists at the 2018 Asian Games
Kotchawan Chomchuen
Asian Games medalists in taekwondo
Kotchawan Chomchuen
Kotchawan Chomchuen